Sverker Thorén (born 28 January 1955), is a Swedish Liberal People's Party politician, member of the Riksdag 2002–2006.

References

Members of the Riksdag from the Liberals (Sweden)
Living people
1955 births
Members of the Riksdag 2002–2006
Place of birth missing (living people)